Miss Venezuela 1963 was the tenth edition of Miss Venezuela pageant held at Teatro Paris (now called Teatro La Campiña) in Caracas, Venezuela, on May 30, 1963. The winner of the pageant was Irene Morales, Miss Guárico.

The pageant was broadcast live by RCTV.

Results
Miss Venezuela 1963 - Irene Morales (Miss Guárico)
1st runner-up - Norah Luisa Duarte (Miss Carabobo) to Miss International 1963
2nd runner-up - Milagros Galíndez (Miss Miranda) to Miss World 1963
3rd runner-up - Margarita Fonseca (Miss Caracas) to Miss Nations 1964
4th runner-up - Margarita Rego (Miss Aragua)

Special awards
 Miss Fotogénica (Miss Photogenic) - Martha Almenar (Miss Nueva Esparta)
 Miss Sonrisa (Best Smile) - Angelina Pérez (Miss Departamento Libertador)

Delegates

 Miss Anzoátegui - Esperanza Montero
 Miss Apure - Francia Sandoval Gómez
 Miss Aragua - Margarita Rego
 Miss Carabobo - Norah Luisa Duarte Rojas 
 Miss Caracas - Margarita Fonseca
 Miss Departamento Libertador - Angelina Pérez Prieto
 Miss Departamento Vargas - Ruth Negrón D'Elias
 Miss Distrito Federal - Violeta Martínez Ballestrini
 Miss Falcón - Graciela Margarita Castellanos
 Miss Guárico - Irene Morales
 Miss Lara - Amanda Peñalver
 Miss Mérida - Francis Rodríguez
 Miss Miranda - Milagros Galíndez Castillo
 Miss Nueva Esparta - Martha Almenar
 Miss Táchira - Beatriz Márquez Marroquí
 Miss Trujillo - Josefina Torres Segovia
 Miss Zulia - Alba Marina González Pirela

External links
Miss Venezuela official website

1963 beauty pageants
1963 in Venezuela